The Worshipful Company of Feltmakers is one of the livery companies of the City of London. The Feltmakers, or makers of felt hats, were incorporated by letters patent granted by James I in 1604. They received an extended royal charter in 1667. The company gradually lost its role as a trade association for felt hat makers, due to both advancements in technology and the increased popularity of silk hats. Like a majority of Livery companies, the Feltmakers' Company is now primarily a charitable institution, but has a number of milliners amongst its members.
	
The Feltmakers' Company ranks sixty-third in the order of precedence for livery companies. Its motto is Decus Et Tutamen, a Latin phrase taken from Virgil meaning An Ornament and a Safeguard. (The phrase also appears around the milled edge of certain pound coins.)

The company's Master is Neil Edwards, who was installed as Master on 7 October 2022. Masters normally serve for one year. The company's Upper Warden is Simon Wilkinson.

External links

References
Notes

Bibliography

Feltmakers
Hatmaking
1604 establishments in England